Cipangocharax is a genus of tropical land snails with an operculum, terrestrial gastropod mollusks in the family Cyclophoridae.

This genus name has occasionally been misspelled as "Cipangochalax".

Species
Species within the genus Cipangocharax include:
Cipangocharax akioi  Minato & Abe, 1980 
Cipangocharax biexcisus H. A. Pilsbry, 1902 
Cipangocharax kiuchii Minato & Abe, 1982 
 Cipangocharax okamurai Azuma, 1980 
Cipangocharax placeonovitas Minato, 1981

References 

Target Shellfish Species of 4th Animal Distribution Survey (All-Species Survey)
A Key to the Species of the Genus Cipangocharax (Alycaeidae) (in Japanese), Journal ちりぼたん    24(1)  pp.1-3 19930731 

 
Cyclophoridae
Taxonomy articles created by Polbot